Durango is a center of media in southwestern Colorado and the larger Four Corners region. The following is a list of media outlets based in the city.

Print

Newspapers
The Durango Herald is the city's primary newspaper that is published daily. The Durango Telegraph, a weekly alternative newspaper, is also published in the city. DGO Magazine, a free alt-weekly also known as "freekly," is published at Durango as well.

Radio
The following is a list of radio stations that broadcast from and/or are licensed to Durango.

AM

FM

Television
Durango is in the Albuquerque-Santa Fe television market.

The following is a list of television stations that broadcast from and/or are licensed to Durango

References

Durango
Durango, Colorado